Orchid is the debut studio album by Swedish progressive metal band Opeth, released on 15 May 1995 in Europe by Candlelight Records, and on 24 June 1997 in the United States by Century Black. It was reissued in 2000 with one bonus track called "Into the Frost of Winter", an early unproduced rehearsal recording by the band. The recording sessions occurred at the old Unisound studio, in Finspång with production by Opeth alongside Dan Swanö. The band did not record a demo to get signed to a record label. Lee Barrett, the founder of Candlelight Records, enjoyed an Opeth rehearsal tape, and decided to sign the band. The album received critical acclaim.

Background
Opeth was formed in 1990 in Stockholm, Sweden, by David Isberg. Isberg invited Mikael Åkerfeldt (of the recently disbanded band Eruption) to join Opeth. The other members of the band took exception to this, and quit Opeth, leaving only Isberg and Åkerfeldt. Anders Nordin, Nick Döring, and Andreas Dimeo were brought in as replacements. They rehearsed in an elementary school using old 60's equipment that they found there. Opeth played a show in February 1991, along with Therion, Excruciate and Authorise, in Stockholm. Only two songs were performed for their set. Åkerfeldt commented about the show: "I reckon it was probably the worst appearance one can have witnessed. We were so fucking nervous that we all wanted to cancel the fucking gig and just go back home."

The band played a second show in Gothenburg. Döring and Dimeo had quit the band since the first show, so Opeth contacted two members of the band Crimson Cat, Kim Pettersson and Johan DeFarfalla, and asked them to join them onstage. Other bands playing the show were At the Gates, Therion, Desecrator, Megaslaughter and Sarcazm. After the show, De Farfalla left Opeth to spend time with his girlfriend. He was replaced by Åkerfeldt's friend Peter Lindgren, who was playing in a joke band called Sylt i krysset. He accepted the offer to play bass in Opeth because he wanted to do something more serious. Pettersson later left the band, and Lindgren switched to guitar. Isberg quit in 1992, due to creative differences. Åkerfeldt became the new vocalist. He and Lindgren started writing material immediately. They rehearsed as a 3-piece for more than a year. Stefan Guteklint joined on bass, but left soon after the band signed its first record deal with Candlelight Records, in 1994.

Opeth were signed by Candlelight without a demo. For them, to go into the studio to record a demo was as big a step as going in to record an album. Åkerfeldt explained, "We didn't have any money to spend on things like that. That would cost us, at least, a couple of hundred bucks ... We didn't know where to go to record a demo." Åkerfeldt had sent out rehearsal tapes to several labels, but never received a reply. But the band received an offer from Lee Barrett to record an album. Åkerfeldt found it "quite weird". Anders Nyström (of Katatonia) said Candlelight was interested, based on a rumor from Samoth (of Emperor). Samoth had sent out a tape of unsigned bands to Barrett at Candlelight. It only had a few seconds of "The Apostle in Triumph". Barrett liked it so much he wanted to sign the band. Later, Åkerfeldt received a call from Barrett, who wanted to release a full-length album by Opeth.

Recording and production
Orchid was recorded during March 1994 in Finspång, where the old Unisound Studio was located. Opeth moved from Stockholm to Finspång, where Dan Swanö had rented an apartment for them. The studio was located in the cellar of a small house situated in the middle of a field. The album was produced and mixed by Swanö and the band, and engineered by Swanö. For the recording they had asked Johan De Farfalla to play session bass guitar. He eventually became a full-time member.

Despite the nervousness of the band members, the recording sessions ran smoothly. "We were so ready before we went into the studio, we'd been rehearsing six or seven times a week, and we'd even been rehearsing in pitch black darkness in order to play the songs perfectly without even looking", Åkerfeldt recollected in 2009, speaking to Kerrang! However, the band regretted not having enough time to record the acoustic piece "Requiem". The song was first recorded at Unisound, but the band was unhappy with the result. "Requiem" was then recorded in a studio in Stockholm with Pontus Norgren acting as co-producer. Due to a mix-up in Orchid'''s mastering process, the end of "Requiem" was placed at the beginning of "The Apostle in Triumph". The band has expressed regret for this, and said it was no fault of their own.

Musical style and lyrical themes

Music
The music in Orchid combines elements influenced by progressive rock and acoustics pieces of folk music to the black metal scream and the death metal growl, as well having clean vocals. It also contains influences from jazz and melodic passages played by a piano and acoustic guitars. Opeth sounded much different than the casual black or death metal bands at that time and it's the closest album that the band came to the black genre. Critics described the sound of the album as it being "unique". Jim Raggi wrote "If you're wanting the more deathy and song oriented Opeth, skip down to My Arms, Your Hearse and go from there. If you're looking for a unique journey of music built alternately around dual guitar harmonies knocking into sequences when the two guitars and the bass are all playing different parts, stop-start transitions at times and smooth here-to-theres at others, here you go." Matt Smith stated that "with Orchid, the band introduced its blend of intricate, down-tempo acoustic guitar and piano lines and swinging, Celtic-sounding, distorted rhythms."

Most songs of the album exceed nine minutes, but there are two instrumental songs of short duration. These two instrumental songs are "Silhouette" and "Requiem". The first song was recorded just hours before they were leaving the studio and is a brief piano interlude. They were impressed that Anders Nordin played the piano very well. Lindgren said, "I remember the look on Dan's face when we said, 'Our drummer can play the piano.' He didn't believe a word we were saying. Dan can play the piano. Most guys play like shit. When Anders started playing, Dan was actually impressed." Åkerfeldt later said, "I'm still quite impressed." The other instrumental is an acoustic epic, according to Lindgren. Åkerfeldt borrowed a Spanish acoustic guitar called a Trameleuc from a guitar store to play the song.

The bonus track, "Into the Frost of Winter", is an early recording of the band during a 1992 rehearsal. The song contains some segments which were later reworked into "Advent", the opening track on their second album Morningrise.

Lyrics
After the members left Opeth, Mikael Åkerfeldt and David Isberg began to write the songs. Åkerfeldt commented about: "As you might understand I was more or less influenced by the occult back then, although in no serious manner. Music wise I was really into the twisted, dark, and evil-sounding riffs. The lyrics written by both me and David were pure Satanic chantings!" According to Åkerfeldt, "the idea for Opeth was for it to be evil—satanic lyrics and evil riffs. I chose my notes so they sounded evil." The first two songs that Åkerfeldt and Isberg wrote were "Requiem of Lost Souls" and "Mystique of the Baphomet" (later "Mark of the Damned" and later "Forest of October"). When Isberg quit the band, Åkerfeldt and Peter Lindgren "really felt that we had found a real original way of playing. There were at the time almost no other band [sic] using that many harmonies as we did." "Forest of October" "is the best song on the album", according to Lindgren. Åkerfeldt says he doesn't remember what it is about, and that he only remembers that he wrote the lyrics to sound like the music.

Åkerfeldt said that "The Twilight Is My Robe" used to be called "Oath" and "is a satanic song. Like an oath to Satan." He also said that one part of the song is "a complete rip-off" of Scorpions' "Fly to the Rainbow". The most evil song on the album, said Lindgren, the lyrics for "Under the Weeping Moon" were "some kind of satanic worship of the moon. It doesn't really deal with anything", according to Åkerfeldt, and on the later The Roundhouse Tapes live album, he would describe the song's lyrics as "absolute black metal nonsense". He also complimented the melody of "The Apostle in Triumph" and considered it to be lyrically "a combination of nature and satanic worship". The longest song of the album, "In Mist She Was Standing", was the last song completed. The song is about a nightmare, and is inspired by the film The Lady in Black.

Cover and layout

Cover
When the recordings were completed, the band immediately started working on the cover layout. Åkerfeldt had been in contact with the photographer Torbjorn Ekebacke for a while, and learned that Ekebacke also created graphic layouts. He was asked to provide a layout for Orchid. Opeth ordered the orchid seen on the cover from the Netherlands. The first pressing was released without the "Opeth" logo on the front cover. The photographs on the back were taken in Sörskogen. Åkerfeldt stated that "we really were lucky as the sunset that evening, was probably the most beautiful one I had ever seen. We shot several cool shots that day, but those silhouette ones were the best."

Layout
The band already had one issue with album about the mastering of "Requiem" (see Recording and production), a second problem arose with the album: the lyric pages were the opposite to what Opeth had expected. The colours had been reversed, and the CD itself was blue instead of black. The band again expressed regret for this, but fans stated they liked how the colours looked. After finishing the layout, the band sent the album to England.

Reception

Critical reaction to the album was mostly positive. Critic Matt Smith of Maelstrom said that it is one of the best Opeth albums, and "it set the tone for the albums to come". However, before Orchids release, according to Åkerfeldt:

John Serba of AllMusic said that Orchid was "quite an audacious release, a far-beyond-epic prog/death monstrosity exuding equal parts beauty and brutality – an album so brilliant, so navel-gazingly pretentious that, in retrospect, Opeth's future greatness was a foregone conclusion". John Chedsey of Satan Stole My Teddybear stated that the album is "one of the more stunning and devastatingly powerful debuts of any metal band in any genre." Jim Raggi of Lamentations of the Flame Princess wrote that "perhaps the most easily recognizable voice in all of extreme metal, Mikael Åkerfeldt really does make some noise in his debut. I can't think of very many vocalists in 1994 (when the album was recorded) who used both clean and growled vocals freely. I'm definitely not going to go so far as to say he was the first (Dan Swanö did beat him on that at least!) but all those years ago, Åkerfeldt did set the standard for what the extreme progressive music vocalist should sound like". He added, "The fact is this album is a groundbreaking milestone in heavy metal for the progressive elements that are thrown into the more metallic music and the extreme vocals" and the sound of the album is "completely unique". Chris Dick of Decibel stated in Precious Metal: Decibel Presents the Stories Behind 25 Extreme Metal Masterpieces:Precious Metal, p. 246

Not all critics were positive, however. French magazine Metallian said the album was "boring and uneventful" and gave it 1/10. Johan De Farfalla stated that "from the death metal scene, they thought, 'Wow! This is cool!' From the educated musicians I knew, they said, 'This sucks. The sound is bad. You should re-record this.' But I think people really liked it, apart from the sound."

Track listing

Personnel
Credits for Orchid adapted from liner notes.Opeth Mikael Åkerfeldt – lead vocals, guitars
 Peter Lindgren – guitars
 Anders Nordin – drums, percussion, piano on "Silhouette"
 Johan De Farfalla – bass (tracks 1–7), backing vocalsAdditional personnel Stefan Guteklint – bass guitar on "Into the Frost of Winter"Production' Opeth – mixing
 Dan Swanö – engineering, mixing
 Peter in de Betou – mastering
 Pontus Norgren – co-production on "Requiem"
 Torbjörn Ekebacke – artwork, photography

Release history
The release of Orchid was delayed, and with the band anxious to play gigs for the album, Opeth began performing a few shows when Lee Barrett of Candlelight Records led them to the United Kingdom. One of the performances was held at the London Astoria, and the show also featured Impaled Nazarene, Ved Buens Ende, and Hecate Enthroned.

A year after the recording of the album, Orchid'' was released on 15 May 1995 in Europe by Candlelight Records on CD, and on cassette by Mystic Production. It was released on 24 June 1997 in the United States by Century Black. It was reissued in 2000 in Europe by Candlelight and in the United States by Century Media, with one bonus track, "Into the Frost of Winter". In the same year, it was released as a double-LP vinyl edition on Displeased Records, limited to 1000 copies. A special edition was released by Candlelight in 2003.

References
 

1995 debut albums
Albums produced by Dan Swanö
Candlelight Records albums
Century Media Records albums
Opeth albums